José Mojica Marins (March 13, 1936 – February 19, 2020) was a Brazilian filmmaker, director, screenwriter, film and television actor and media personality. Marins is also known by his alter ego Zé do Caixão (in English, Coffin Joe).

Marins is noted for his trademark low-budget film style, and was known to primarily use friends and amateur actors to portray characters and function as crew. Although primarily known for films of the horror genre, Marins also produced trash cinema, exploitation, drugsploitation, sexploitation (often in the form of pseudo-documentaries), and westerns.

Filmography

Films about José Mojica Marins

References
General

Specific

External links

 Official Zé do Caixão filmography 
José Mojica Marins filmography at Portal Heco de Cinema 
Encarnação do Demônio Official film site 
Babu - The Cross and the Pentagram Official film site 

Male actor filmographies
Director filmographies